Erlach is a small village located in Bavaria, Germany. It is in Upper Franconia, in the Bamberg district. Erlach is a constituent community of Hirschaid.

In 2019, the village had a population of 445.

Geography
Erlach lies about 12 kilometers south of Bamberg.

A stream called the Reiche Ebrach flows through the village. The Rhine–Main–Danube Canal is east of the village.

History 
The town was first mentioned in 1062 as Sconen erlaha ("the beautiful Erlach").

Erlach had a monastery in the Middle Ages named the "Kloster Schlüsselau." Today there is a small church, consecrated in 1954, with a cemetery attached to it.

A school was built in 1918, but it is no longer used today. The village also has one of the oldest mills in the region.

Culture
There are several community organizations based in Erlach, including:
 "1. FC Eintracht Erlach e. V.": Sports club 
 "Bayerischer Bauernverband": Bavarian farmers' association 
 "Freiwillige Feuerwehr Erlach": Volunteer fire department 
 "Jagdgenossenschaft Erlach": Hunting organization 
 "Obst- und Gartenbauverein Erlach e.V.": Fruit and horticulture club 
 "Ortskulturring Erlach": Local culture club 
 "Soldatenkameradschaft Erlach": Veteran's group 
 "Verein 'Gemütlichkeit' Erlach": Local culture club

References

External links
 Reiche Ebrach (German Wikipedia)

Villages in Bavaria
Bamberg (district)